Trisuloides xizanga is a moth of the family Noctuidae. It is found in China (Xizang).

References

Moths described in 2011
Pantheinae